Aurore Delaigle  is a Professor and ARC Future Fellow in the Department of Mathematics and Statistics at the University of Melbourne, Australia. Her research interests include nonparametric statistics, deconvolution and functional data analysis.

Education and career

Following her undergraduate degree in mathematics at Université catholique de Louvain, Belgium, she completed a PhD in statistics at the same institution on kernel estimation in deconvolution problems. In her early career, she undertook a postdoctoral fellowship at University of California, Davis, before joining University of California, San Diego as an assistant professor. She was also a Reader at the University of Bristol.

In 2014, she was promoted to Professor at the University of Melbourne.

Awards and fellowships

While at UC San Diego, she was awarded a Hellman Fellowship (2006–07).

In 2013, she was awarded the Moran Medal from the Australian Academy of Science, for her contribution to "contemporary statistical problems".

From 2013 to 2018, she is an ARC Future Fellow, investigating new nonparametric statistical methods.

She is a Fellow of the Institute of Mathematical Statistics for her work in "non-parametric function estimation, measurement error problems, and functional data".  She is also an elected member of the International Statistical Institute. In 2018 she became a Fellow of the American Statistical Association and in May 2020 she was elected Fellow of the Australian Academy of Science.

References

External links

Living people
Australian statisticians
Australian women scientists
Women statisticians
Elected Members of the International Statistical Institute
Fellows of the Institute of Mathematical Statistics
Fellows of the American Statistical Association
Université catholique de Louvain alumni
University of California, San Diego faculty
Academic staff of the University of Melbourne
Belgian emigrants to Australia
Year of birth missing (living people)
Fellows of the Australian Academy of Science